New York Days is an album by Italian jazz trumpeter and composer Enrico Rava recorded in 2008 and released on the ECM label.

Reception
The Allmusic review awarded the album 3½ stars.

Track listing
All compositions by Enrico Rava except as indicated
 "Lulù" - 9:33 
 "Improvisation I" (Stefano Bollani, Larry Grenadier, Paul Motian, Enrico Rava, Mark Turner) - 4:24 
 "Outsider" - 6:17 
 "Certi Angoli Segreti" - 10:55 
 "Interiors" - 10:42 
 "Thank You, Come Again" - 7:05 
 "Count Dracula" - 3:20 
 "Luna Urbana" - 7:39 
 "Improvisation II" (Bollani, Grenadier, Motian, Rava, Turner) - 7:52 
 "Lady Orlando" - 5:31 
 "Blancasnow" - 4:22

Personnel
Enrico Rava - trumpet
Mark Turner - tenor saxophone
Stefano Bollani - piano
Larry Grenadier - bass
Paul Motian - drums

References

ECM Records albums
Enrico Rava albums
2009 albums
Albums produced by Manfred Eicher